Vladimir Zharikov (born November 6, 1938 in Smolensk) is a Soviet and Russian actor, stuntman, stunt coordinator and cinematographer.

A Soviet Spetsnaz serviceman during the Vietnam War, Zharikov subsequently attended the University of Odessa in 1968. After graduation, he worked as a scientist and stuntman for a time before focusing more fully on his chosen career. In addition to his stunt work, featured in 80 movies, he was also an actor, with 17 roles, including 1978's d'Artagnan and Three Musketeers, 1979's The Meeting Place Cannot Be Changed and  Pirates of the 20th Century, and 1987's Desyat Negrityat.

References 

Russian stunt performers
Military personnel of the Vietnam War
Soviet male actors
Russian male actors
People from Smolensk
Living people
1938 births
Soviet military personnel